Kaaterskill Junction station, branch MP 11.8, was one of the smallest  stations on the Ulster & Delaware, and served as the station at the junction between the Stony Clove and Kaaterskill Branch and the Hunter Branch, hence the word "junction" in its name. The station was originally known as the Tannersville Junction station, but its name was changed soon after it was made.

Despite its small size, it had more trains than any other station on the branch, and stayed that way until it was abandoned in 1939. Soon after, it was purchased by Harry L'Hommadeu, a land agent for the New York Central, and expanded into a private dwelling. The station burned down on a winter day in the late 1980s.

Bibliography

References

External links
Ulster and Delaware Railroad Historical Society map

Railway stations in the Catskill Mountains
Former Ulster and Delaware Railroad stations
Railway stations closed in 1940
Railway stations in Greene County, New York
Former railway stations in New York (state)